Bimbo Manuel  (born 30 October 1958) is a Nigerian actor. He was nominated for Best actor in a supporting role at the 2013 Nollywood Movies Awards.

Career
Bimbo hails from Lagos State. After graduating from the University of Port Harcourt with a degree in Theater Arts, he began his television career in 1985 as a broadcaster at Ogun State Broadcasting Corporation (OGBC). He later moved to Ogun State Television (OGTV) before commencing his acting career in 1986

Selected filmography

Films
King Invincible
Women's Cot (2005)
Tango with Me (2010)
Heroes & Zeros (2012)
Torn (2013)
Dazzling Mirage  (2014)
Render to Caesar (2014)
October 1 (2014)
Heaven's Hell (2015)
Shijuwomi (2015)
93 Days (2016)
Banana Island Ghost (2017)
Seven (2019)
Charge and Bail (2021)
If i am president 2018
The Governor (2016)

Television
Checkmate
Fuji House of Commotion
Tinsel
Castle and Castle
King of Boys: The Return of the King

References

External links

20th-century Nigerian male actors
21st-century Nigerian male actors
Living people
1958 births
Male actors from Lagos State
Yoruba male actors
University of Port Harcourt alumni
Male actors in Yoruba cinema
Nigerian male television actors